Fort William is a fort in Hastings, Calcutta (Kolkata). It was built during the early years of the British occupation of Bengal. It sits on the eastern banks of the River Hooghly, the major distributary of the River Ganges. One of Kolkata's most enduring British-era military fortifications, other than those in Bombay and Madras, it extends over an area of seventy hectares.

The fort was named after King William III. In front of the Fort is the Maidan, the largest park in the country. An internal guard room became the Black Hole of Calcutta. Today it is the Headquarters of Eastern Command of the Indian Army.

History

There are two Fort Williams. The original fort was built in the year 1696 by the British East India Company under the orders of Sir John Goldsborough which took a decade to complete. The permission was granted by Mughal Emperor Aurangzeb. Sir Charles Eyre started construction near the bank of the Hooghly River with the South-East Bastion and the adjacent walls. It was named after King William III in 1700. John Beard, Eyre's successor, added the North-East Bastion in 1701, and in 1702 started the construction of the Government House (Factory, see Factory (trading post)) at the centre of the fort. Construction ended in 1706. The original building had two stories and projecting wings. In 1756, the Nawab of Bengal, Siraj Ud Daulah, attacked the Fort, temporarily conquered the city, and changed its name to Alinagar. This led the British to build a new fort in the Maidan. Robert Clive started rebuilding the fort in 1758, after the Battle of Plassey (1757); construction was completed in 1781 at a cost of approximately two million pounds. The area around the Fort was cleared, and the Maidan became "the Lungs of Kolkata". It stretches for around 3 km in the north–south direction and is around 1 km wide. The headquarters of the Indian Ordnance Factories was established in 1775 at Fort William.

Today, Fort William is the property of Indian Army. The headquarters of Eastern Command is based there, with provisions for accommodating 10,000 army personnel. The Army guards it heavily, and civilian entry is restricted.

Much of Fort William is unchanged, but St Peter's Church, which used to serve as a chaplaincy centre for the British citizens of Kolkata, is now a library for the troops of HQ Eastern Command.

A war memorial has been created at the entrance of the fort, and the fort also houses a museum which displays artifacts from the Indo-Pakistani War of 1971, especially those related to the battles in the Eastern sector and the Bangladesh Liberation War.

First Indian Masonic lodge
In 1730, Ralph Farrwinter and other members of the East India Company opened the first Indian Masonic lodge, a short time after the creation of the Grand Lodge of England in 1713.

Presidency of Fort William

Structure
Five of its sides face landward, and three towards the Hooghly River. The design is that of a star fort, suited to defence against cannon firing solid shot, and dates from before the advent of explosive shells. The moat can be flooded but is designed as an area in which to use enfilade (or flanking) fire against any attackers reaching the walls. There are six gates: Chowringhee, Plassey, Calcutta, Water Gate, St Georges and the Treasury Gate. There are similar forts at places like Thalassery in Kerala.

Gallery

See also
 Fort William College
 Fort St. George, India

References

Buildings and structures in Kolkata
18th century in Kolkata
Neighbourhoods in Kolkata
William
Indian Army bases
British forts
Tourist attractions in Kolkata